Left Here Alone; Smiling is the fourth studio album by Echo Orbiter.  It was released on Looking Glass Workshop in 2002.   The album was produced using a unique writing and recording style the band called "Audio Impressionism," where individual notes in a progression or arpeggiated notes were individually recorded one by one on different tracks with different sounds and instruments and then meticulously pieced together to form the progression or arpeggiated line.  Each sound is sustained, with a long reverb, overlapping one another in the same manner that Impressionist painters like Monet would blur multiple individual strokes of paint together to form a recognizable object or image.

Track listing

Credits 
Justin Emerle - guitar, vocals, drums, percussion, keyboards
Colin Emerle - bass guitar

References

External links 
Left Here Alone; Smiling

2002 albums
Echo Orbiter albums